Varzeshgah-e Azadi Metro Station, translated as Azadi Stadium Metro Station is a station in Tehran Metro Line 5. It is located north of Tehran-Karaj Freeway and south of Azadi Stadium. It is between Eram-e Sabz Metro Station and Chitgar Metro Station.

References

Tehran Metro stations